Karlslunde IF is a Danish association football club from Karlslunde, Greve Municipality. The football team is part of a sports club with approximately 900 members, and departments for badminton, table tennis, gymnastics, and shooting sports, as well as other activities. The first team of the football department competes in the fifth-tier Denmark Series.

The football department was founded in 1914, when it was established as a department within the club "Carlslunde-Carlstrup Skyttelag" from 1866.

References

External links
Official website 
Karlslunde Stadion Nordic Stadiums

Karlslunde IF
Football clubs in Denmark
Association football clubs established in 1914
1914 establishments in Denmark
Greve Municipality